Air Luxor was an airline based in Luxor Plaza in Lisbon, Portugal, operating a limited number of scheduled flights out of Portela Airport, Lisbon. The airline's operations were located in Building C1 and Hangar 7 in Delta Park, an area in Lisbon Airport.

History

Destinations 

Upon closure, Air Luxor operated scheduled flights to the following destinations:

 Portugal
 Funchal (Madeira Airport)
 France
 (Orly Airport)
 Africa
 São Tomé (São Tomé International Airport)

Fleet 
Over the years, the Air Luxor fleet consisted of these aircraft types:

References 

Defunct airlines of Portugal
Airlines established in 1988
Airlines disestablished in 2006
Portuguese companies established in 1988
2006 disestablishments in Portugal